Aphonopelma serratum is a species of spider in the family Theraphosidae, found in Mexico. This species was first described as Eurypelma serratum in 1891 by Eugène Simon, and was transferred to the genus, Aphonopelma, in 1993 by Günter Schmidt.

Alvarez (2014) comments that A. serratum can be difficult to distinguish from A. anitahoffmannae since they both have similar colouring.

References

serratum
Spiders of Mexico
Spiders described in 1891
Taxa named by Eugène Simon